Oleksandr Oleksandrovych Roshchynskyi (born 30 November 2000) is a Ukrainian professional footballer who plays as a goalkeeper for Chernihiv.

Career
Roshchynskyi started his career in SDYuShOR Desna, the youth academy of Desna Chernihiv, before moving to FC Desna-2 Chernihiv. In 2017, he moved again to Avangard Korukivka.

FC Chernihiv
In 2020, Roshchynskyi moved to FC Chernihiv in the Ukrainian Second League and made his debut for the club against Rubikon Kyiv. On 18 August 2021 he played in the Second preliminary round of the 2021–22 Ukrainian Cup against Chaika Petropavlivska Borshchahivka, saving a penalty and helping his team advance to the next round for the first time in club history.

Career statistics

Club

Honours
FC Chernihiv
 Chernihiv Oblast Football Championship: 2019

References

External links
 
 
 
 Oleksandr Roshchynskyi at FC Chernigiv 
 

2000 births
Living people
Footballers from Chernihiv
Ukrainian footballers
Association football goalkeepers
SDYuShOR Desna players
FC Chernihiv players
FC Desna-2 Chernihiv players
FC Avanhard Koriukivka players
Ukrainian Second League players
Ukrainian First League players